Loch Alvie is a loch located south of the River Spey, in the civil parish of Alvie, in the council area of Highland, Scotland. The loch is about two miles southwest of Aviemore. HMS Loch Alvie, launched in 1944, is named after the loch.

References

Lochs of Highland (council area)
Inverness-shire